Kilvington Grammar School (previously named Kilvington Girls Grammar) is an independent, Baptist, co-educational day school, located in Ormond, a suburb in the Glen Eira region of Melbourne, Victoria, Australia.

Established in 1923 by Caroline and Constance Barrett, Kilvington has a non-selective enrolment policy and currently caters for approximately 800
students from the Early Learning Centre to Year 12.

The school is affiliated with the Junior School Heads Association of Australia (JSHAA), the Association of Independent Schools of Victoria (AISV), the Association of Heads of Independent Schools of Australia (AHISA), and was a founding member of Girls Sport Victoria (GSV).

History
Kilvington Grammar School traces its origins back to 1922 when Phyllis Fethers employed the services of a young woman called Constance Barrett as a tutor for her children. As more children joined the group, it became apparent that there was a need for a school in the Ormond area. Constance enlisted the experience of her mother, a qualified educationist, and together they established Ormond Girls' School, with thirteen students on 19 June 1923.

Finding a permanent residence for the Ormond School proved difficult, and after several moves the Barrett women decided to purchase a vacant block of land and build. Constance successfully negotiated a sizeable bank loan to fund the new school.

The school was built in Walsh St, close to its current site and was officially opened as Kilvington Girls' Grammar in 1929. The school was named after another of a similar name in England.

Enrolment numbers improved at the new site, and in 1948 the school was sold to the Baptist Union, where it was subsequently renamed Kilvington Baptist Girls' Grammar School. To accommodate further growth, Kilvington moved to its much larger current site in 1955.

The principal, Jon Charlton, announced in June 2010 that from 2011 the school would become coeducational. The decision was a controversial one, and some parents threatened to withdraw their daughter's enrolment from the school.

Kilvington Grammar School has recently completed three new buildings since its change to a co-ed, independent school; the Middle School Centre for Excellence the VCE Study Centre, and the Kilvington Sport Centre.

Principals
Kilvington Grammar School has had ten principles or formerly headmistresses since the school was established in 1923.

Curriculum 
Kilvington Grammar School offers their Year 11 and 12 students the Victorian Certificate of Education (VCE).

Notable alumnae
Julia Banks- Federal Member of Parliament for Chisholm, elected 2016
Christine Forster AM – Director of VicSuper Pty Ltd; Deputy chairman of the Victorian Water Trust Advisory Council; Named on the Victorian Honour Roll of Women 2004; Recipient of the Centenary Medal 2003
Linda Hanel – Champion Butterfly Swimmer, two time world record holder (1978 Commonwealth Games and 1976 Summer Olympics)
Jayashri Kulkarni Order of Australia- Monash University Professor & Head of Department, President of International Association for Women's Mental Health 2017-2019.

See also
 List of schools in Victoria
 Victorian Certificate of Education

References

External links
 Kilvington website

Educational institutions established in 1923
Private schools in Melbourne
Baptist schools in Australia
Junior School Heads Association of Australia Member Schools
1923 establishments in Australia
Girls Sport Victoria
Buildings and structures in the City of Glen Eira